In 2022, heavy tensions broke out between the Democratic Republic of the Congo and Rwanda, which have led to several alleged attacks by Congolese and Rwandan forces on each other's territory. Rwandan forces have been caught crossing into the DRC multiple times, usually fighting alongside Congolese rebels.

The crisis is related to an ongoing offensive beginning in March 2022 by the March 23 Movement (M23), which the Congo and the United Nations accuse Rwanda of not only supporting but actively fighting for. Rwanda and M23 have also accused the DRC of working together with the Democratic Forces for the Liberation of Rwanda (FDLR), a racist Hutu Power paramilitary group that took part in the Rwandan Genocide. Both the Congo and Rwanda deny they support the FDLR and M23, respectively, contrary to research and reports that confirm both sides' allegations. The MONUSCO peacekeeping mission maintains that it is not involved in the conflict, but has been accused by Rwanda of taking sides.

Timeline

2022

May 
DRC forces said that they had captured two Rwandan soldiers that had been sent into the Congo in disguise. Both were released on June 11.

May 23 
DRC forces reportedly shelled Musanze District, in the Northern Province of Rwanda, injuring several people.

May 27 
The Democratic Republic of the Congo ordered the suspension of all RwandAir flights. Rwanda condemned the action and RwandAir decided to retaliate by cancelling flights to Kinshasa, Lubumbashi, and Goma.

May 29 
African Union Chairman and President of Senegal Macky Sall said that the African Union was supporting a "peaceful resolution" to the tensions.

June 2 
Angolan president João Lourenço attempted to mediate a resolution between the two countries in Luanda.

June 8 
Alexander De Croo, the Prime Minister of Belgium, compared the Eastern DRC to Ukraine in a visit to Kinshasa, additionally making comments implying his support for the Congo in its border crisis with Rwanda.

June 9 
The Democratic Republic of the Congo said it had discovered that 500 Rwandan special forces had been sent into the Tshanzu region in North Kivu.

June 10 
The DRC accused Rwanda of firing rockets at a school in Biruma, North Kivu, killing two children and seriously injuring another person of unspecified age. Rwanda also said that the Congo had fired rockets into Western Rwanda from the direction of Bunagana.

June 11 
The United Nations called for a ceasefire between the two countries.

June 12 
The Congo alleged that Rwanda intended to occupy the city of Bunagana.

June 13 
On June 13, M23 forces captured the city of Bunagana from the DRC, forcing about 30,000 people civilian to flee to Uganda. However, the DRC claimed that Rwandan forces were helping to occupy the city. The rebels claimed that taking Bunagana wasn't their goal but decided to do it after repeated attacks by the Congolese army. They also said that they were open to doing direct negotiations with the government. The DRC described the fall of Bunagana as "no less than an invasion" by Rwanda. Two senior Congolese security sources claimed that Uganda was also helping the M23 in their offensive. That same day, Rwanda charged the MONUSCO mission of taking sides in the conflict, which it said was allowing the Congo to carry out cross-border attacks in Rwanda.

The heavy fighting also caused about 137 Congolese soldiers and 37 police officers to flee into Uganda, where they surrendered to Ugandan forces.

A Kinyarwanda speaking DRC Armed Forces (FARDC) lieutenant colonel was attacked and beaten by a mob in Kisangani.

June 15 
Thousands of demonstrators organized a protest against Rwandan actions in Goma. The protest quickly turned into an anti-Rwandan riot as an angry mob pillaged and attacked shops owned by Rwandans, seizing vehicles to check if Rwandans were inside. Congolese riot police fired tear gas at protesters after some tried to enter a border checkpoint at the Rwandan border. Several Rwandans in Goma responded by fleeing the country.

On the same day, the DRC suspended all "memoranda of understanding, agreements, and conventions concluded with Rwanda", demanding the withdrawal of all alleged Rwandan military personnel within the boundaries of the country.

June 17 
Just a few hours after Congolese security officials called for the DRC to cut all ties with Rwanda, a Congolese soldier crossed into Rubavu District carrying an AK-47 and was shot to death by a Rwanda National Police officer. The Rwanda Defence Force said that the soldier was killed after he started shooting at civilians and security forces, and had injured two officers. The Congo shut down the two countries' border in response to the officer's death, adding that it would open an investigation into the events.

As a vehicle brought back the officer's body to Goma, a crowd made up of hundreds of people followed the vehicle shouting "hero, hero" and describing President of Rwanda Paul Kagame as an assassin. Some members of the crowd were documented yelling hateful slogans against Tutsis.

July 
The Rwanda and DRC both came to an agreement held in Angola on July 6 to begin a "de-escalation process" between the two nations. M23 leader Willy Ngoma ordered a new offensive the next day, asserting that "Only the M23 can sign the cease-fire with the government."

August 
In early August, a report for the United Nations by independent experts was leaked to the press. The report provided evidence that Rwandan troops had entered Congolese territory to support M23, fighting alongside the insurgents. These findings led to calls by journalists and officials in the DRC for the UN to sanction Rwanda.

October 24 
A Rwandan soldier running away from the Rwandan military's 401st battalion surrendered himself to a MONUSCO base in Kiwanja, saying that he had been sent to Rwanda as part of a military operation and begged the UN troops not to send him back to Rwanda. He was handed over to FARDC forces on November 4.

November 5 
The Kivu Security Barometre, a project of the University of New York's Congo Study Group, found that satellite photos showing a battle from late October 2022 in Rugari, Rutshuru Territory revealed soldiers with insignias similar to those of the Rwandan Defence Force.

November 19 
On November 19 a Congolese soldier was shot dead as he crossed a border post near Rubavu District. The Rwanda Defence Force said that he had been killed after shooting at the guard towers. The FARDC confirmed that the soldier had been killed, identifying him as a recent recruit to the armed forces who went missing after he got lost during an army patrol. The DRC and Rwanda both say they are investigating the incident.

At the 2022 Francophonie summit in Tunis, the DRC representative Jean-Michel Sama Lukonde refused to take part in a group photo with other Francophone leaders (including the Rwandan representative) as a protest against Rwanda's actions in the Congo.

November 24 
The East African Community demanded for both a ceasefire between Rwanda and the Congo as well as ordering the M23 movement to withdraw from all occupied territories. The EAC stated it would lead a military intervention to quell the unrest in Kivu if the orders were not obeyed. At a summit in Luanda, Angola, Rwanda and the DRC both agreed to hold a ceasefire which was officially enforced on November 25 at 16:00 GMT. M23 rejected the ceasefire since they had not been invited to participate in the dialogue. A spokesman for the rebel group told Agence France-Presse that "M23 has seen the document on social media. ... There was nobody [from M23] in the summit, so it doesn't really concern us... Normally when there is a cease-fire it is between the two warring sides."

December 5 
The Democratic Republic of the Congo's government announced that 272 civilians were killed in a massacre in the eastern town of Kishishe, North Kivu. The Congolese government blamed the killings on the M23 movement, in which M23 denied. An investigation was opened by Democratic Republic of the Congo's attorney general.

2023

January 19 
The Rwandan government claimed that the DRC had a "clear indication" that it was "preparing for war". Rwanda also claimed that the DRC had imported European mercenaries on their behalf.

January 24 
A Congolese Su-25 was damaged by MANPAD fire by Rwandan forces after Rwanda claimed it violated its airspace. The attack, which happened between the cities of Gisenyi and Goma, was responded to with a statement that said, "The government considers this umpteenth attack by Rwanda as a deliberate action." It was also said that the plane suffered only minor damage.

See also

 Kivu conflict
 First Congo War
 Second Congo War
 M23 rebellion
 M23 offensive (2022)
 Democratic Republic of the Congo–Rwanda border

References

2022 in the Democratic Republic of the Congo
2022 in Rwanda
2023 in the Democratic Republic of the Congo
2023 in Rwanda
Conflicts in 2022
Conflicts in 2023
Democratic Republic of the Congo–Rwanda relations
Military history of Rwanda
Military history of the Democratic Republic of the Congo
M23 offensive (2022)